Coelogyne usitana is a species of orchid discovered in the late 1990s. It was named in honour of the collector Villamor T. Usita, by Jürgen Röth and Olaf Gruβ in the German orchid magazine Die Orchidee. It was discovered in central-east Mindanao, Philippines where it grows at elevations of about 800 metres on the horizontal branches of trees.

The inflorescence can bear 30 or more flowers over a long period of time, with only one or two blooms open at a time. The flowers are about 6 cm in diameter and face the downward, possibly to shield the bloom from rain. The colour contrast in the flowers is rare in the genus.

References 

Usitana
Endemic orchids of the Philippines
Flora of Mindanao